is a Japanese real estate company, established in 1964 and headquartered in Takamatsu, Kagawa Prefecture. It was previously part of the Anabuki Construction group, but is separate since 2000. Anabuki Kosan markets condominiums under the brand Alpha, and since more recently Alpha Smart. The president is Tadatsugu Anabuki.

References

External links 
 Anabuki Kosan official website 

Real estate companies established in 1964
Companies based in Kagawa Prefecture
Real estate companies of Japan